Wajid Ali (born 12 January 1981) is a Pakistani first-class cricketer who played for Abbottabad cricket team.

References

External links
 

1981 births
Living people
Pakistani cricketers
Abbottabad cricketers
Defence Housing Authority cricketers
Cricketers from Karachi
Karachi cricketers
Khyber Pakhtunkhwa cricketers
Sui Southern Gas Company cricketers